Julio Segolini (born 20 August 1952) is an Argentine field hockey player. He competed in the men's tournament at the 1972 Summer Olympics.

References

External links
 

1952 births
Living people
Argentine male field hockey players
Olympic field hockey players of Argentina
Field hockey players at the 1972 Summer Olympics
Place of birth missing (living people)